Treasure Island, also known as Mindemoya, is a small island in Lake Mindemoya, on Manitoulin Island, which is in Lake Huron.

The island has no permanent residents, but there are some cottages. It is about 1.4 km in length and about 400 meters wide and about 110 acres.

History 
In 1883, the island was purchased for $60 by William McPherson, a Toronto deputy chief of police. Forty-five years later, in 1928, the island was sold to Joe and Jean Hodgson. The Hodgsons established a tourist camp on the island. Treasure Island Resort remained in business until Joe Hodgson died in 1968. Jean tried to run it but was unsuccessful. The resort was sold a couple of times and became run down.  Finally, the Moeller family of Spencerville, Ohio, bought Treasure Island in 1980. It then became a corporate and family retreat.

The legend of Mindemoya 

According to local tradition, Treasure Island was originally named Mindemoya, because of the distinctive shape of the island: rising at one end to a long, flat hill, with a steep drop to a short, low area at the other end. According to legend, a great chieftain or demi-god who once lived in Sault Ste. Marie, Ontario, had a wife who would not give him any peace. In frustration he eventually kicked her and sent her flying, to land on her hands and knees in Lake Mindemoya, leaving her back and rump above the water, which we see today as the island. The word "Mindemoya" supposedly means "old lady's bottom". The island lent its name to Lake Mindemoya and in turn to the village of Mindemoya, Ontario. The island was renamed "Treasure Island" by a tourist operator who built a resort there in the early 20th century.

See also
Lake island
List of islands of Canada
Recursive islands and lakes

References 

Lake islands of Ontario
Landforms of Manitoulin District